{{Infobox Australian place | type = town
| name          = Coraki
| state         = nsw
| image         = Coraki_Hotel.jpg
| caption       = The Coraki Hotel on Richmond Terrace, Coraki's main street
| lga           = Richmond Valley Council
| stategov      = Clarence 
| fedgov        = Page
| pop           = 1373
| pop_year      = 
| pop_footnotes = 
| postcode      = 2471
| est           = 1849
| elevation     = 
| coordinates   = 
| pushpin_label_position = bottom
| maxtemp       =  
| mintemp       =  
| rainfall      =  
}}
Coraki is a small town that sits on the confluence of the Richmond and Wilson Rivers in northern New South Wales, Australia in Richmond Valley Shire. At the 2016 census, Coraki had a population of 1,277 people.

History
The name Coraki is derived from the Bundjalung word gurigay, meaning the meeting of the waters, and the Bundjalung people are the traditional owners of the area.

The village was founded by William Yabsley in 1849 when Lismore was only a small cattle station and Casino had only one store and a hotel. Yabsley and his family obtained the lease to Brook Station and established the first permanent settlement. He built his shipyard just above The Junction'', as it was first called. Many ships and river boats were launched there and Yabsley opened a store for provisions for the cedar cutters who came to the district. Transport at the time was almost entirely by water and Coraki was the busiest port on the Richmond River.

Description
Coraki is positioned centrally to the hub of the Summerland Way Casino ( west), the regional city of Lismore ( north) and the popular tourist beachside location of Evans Head ( east). At the western boundary of Coraki township lies Box Ridge, an Aboriginal community.

Like many other towns in the area, it is a hub for the local agricultural industries such as cattle, sugar cane and tea tree oil.

Coraki is a small village with many community facilities: Coraki Fire Station, Coraki Public School, St Joseph's Primary School, St Joseph's Church, Coraki Uniting Church, Coraki Anglican Church, Coraki Community Hall, the Rural Transaction Centre, Mid-Richmond Museum, Coraki Library, post office, Mid-Richmond Retirement Village, cemetery, hockey fields, tennis courts, skate park, boat ramp, and the Memorial Park with barbecue, playground and picnic facilities aligning the "healing stones" riverside path. There is a number of local businesses, including the historic Coraki Hotel on Richmond Terrace.

Events
Coraki is the home of the annual Coraki Art Prize (formerly the Coraki Tea Tree Art Prize) and an art competition and exhibition open to all artists and including painting, drawing, photography, sculpture and printmaking, held late October.

In 2010, the first Dylanfest celebrated the music, art and poetry of Bob Dylan in October at the Coraki Hotel.

Annually in November, the Tweed Water Skiing Club converges on the Richmond River to contest the "Coraki Assault" race.

Population
According to the 2016 Census of Population, there were 1,277 people in Coraki, with the following demographic features:
 Aboriginal and Torres Strait Islander people made up 12.0% of the population. 
 82.9% of people were born in Australia and 87.1% of people spoke only English at home.
 The most common responses for religion were Catholic 30.8%, No Religion 21.7% and Anglican 18.8%.

Native title
Included in the land is a bora ring of great cultural significance to the Bundjalung people, near Coraki.

Gallery

References

External links
Northern Rivers Geology Blog – Coraki

Towns in New South Wales
Northern Rivers
Richmond Valley Council